Pop Malay is a pop rock music genre influenced by Malay rhythms. There are two Pop Malay streams including the classification which is popular in Malaysia and the other is in Indonesia. In Indonesia early, Malay pop was popular in the mid-2000s which was pioneered by ST12. Until now, there have been many popular music groups with this genre.

Those that managed to penetrate the domestic and international markets included ST12, Wali, Kangen Band,  Armada, Radja, Hijau Daun, Dadali, Repvblik, Demeises, and others.

The success of the Malay Pop genre in dominating the market share in Indonesia, Malaysia and Brunei in general has also changed the color of the arrangements of Pop genre music groups which were originally popular.

See also

 Indo Pop
 Malaysian popular music

References 

Indonesian music
Indonesian styles of music
Malaysian music
Popular music by country